Algorithms is a monthly peer-reviewed open-access scientific journal of mathematics, covering design, analysis, and experiments on algorithms. The journal is published by MDPI and was established in 2008. The founding editor-in-chief was Kazuo Iwama (Kyoto University). From May 2014 to September 2019, the editor-in-chief was Henning Fernau (Universität Trier). The current editor-in-chief is Frank Werner (Otto-von-Guericke-Universität Magdeburg).

Abstracting and indexing
The journal is abstracted and indexed in:

See also
Journals with similar scope include:
ACM Transactions on Algorithms
Algorithmica
Journal of Algorithms (Elsevier)

References

External links

Computer science journals
Open access journals
MDPI academic journals
English-language journals
Publications established in 2008
Mathematics journals
Monthly journals